In mathematics, the fixed-point index is a concept in topological fixed-point theory, and in particular Nielsen theory. The fixed-point index can be thought of as a multiplicity measurement for fixed points.

The index can be easily defined in the setting of complex analysis: Let f(z) be a holomorphic mapping on the complex plane, and let z0 be a fixed point of f. Then the function f(z) − z is holomorphic, and has an isolated zero at z0. We define the fixed-point index of f at z0, denoted i(f, z0), to be the multiplicity of the zero of the function f(z) − z at the point z0.

In real Euclidean space, the fixed-point index is defined as follows: If x0 is an isolated fixed point of f, then let g be the function defined by

Then g has an isolated singularity at x0, and maps the boundary of some deleted neighborhood of x0 to the unit sphere. We define i(f, x0) to be the Brouwer degree of the mapping induced by g on some suitably chosen small sphere around x0.

The Lefschetz–Hopf theorem
The importance of the fixed-point index is largely due to its role in the Lefschetz–Hopf theorem, which states:

where Fix(f) is the set of fixed points of f, and Λf is the Lefschetz number of f.

Since the quantity on the left-hand side of the above is clearly zero when f has no fixed points, the Lefschetz–Hopf theorem trivially implies the Lefschetz fixed-point theorem.

Notes

References
 Robert F. Brown: Fixed Point Theory, in: I. M. James, History of Topology, Amsterdam 1999, 271–299.

Fixed points (mathematics)
Topology